Elena Dmitrievna Bashkirova (born 1958) is a Russian-born Israeli pianist and musical director.

Bashkirova was born in Moscow, the daughter of pianist and teacher Dimitri Bashkirov. She studied at the Tchaikovsky Conservatory.  She founded the Metropolis Ensemble in Berlin, and in 1998, established the Jerusalem International Festival of Chamber Music, where she serves as artistic director.

Bashkirova has been married twice.  Her first marriage was to Gidon Kremer.  In 1988, she married conductor and pianist Daniel Barenboim.  Bashkirova and Barenboim had met in the early 1980s, while Barenboim was still married to Jacqueline du Pré. During the last years of du Pré's life, Barenboim and Bashkirova lived together in Paris.  The couple have two sons, David Arthur Barenboim (born in 1982), a manager-writer for hip-hop bands, and Michael Barenboim (born in 1985), a classical violinist.

References

1958 births
Living people
Musicians from Moscow
Israeli classical pianists
Russian classical pianists
Israeli women pianists
Jewish classical pianists
21st-century classical pianists
21st-century women pianists